Kaguvere is a village in Märjamaa Parish, Rapla County in western Estonia, north of the Teenuse River.

Notes

Villages in Rapla County